Bystrytsia may refer to:

 Bystrytsia (river), a tributary of Dniester in the West Ukraine
 Bystrytsia (railway stop), a railway stop of the Lviv Railways
 Bystrytsia of Nadvirna, a river
 Bystrytsia of Solotvyn, a river

See also
 Bistrica (disambiguation)